Suleiman Aga, is a form of the Balkan folk dance karşılama. Suleiman Aga is a folk dance spread all over Macedonia and Thrace. The meter is 9/8, and the basic move is danced in four small steps with durations 2, 2, 2 and 3 respectively.

See also 
 Greek dances

Turkish dances
Pomak dances